Romeo Akbar Walter (alluding to the Research and Analysis Wing) is a 2019 Indian Hindi-language action thriller film written and directed by Robbie Grewal. It stars John Abraham, Mouni Roy, Jackie Shroff and Sikandar Kher. The narrative centers on a banker who is recruited as a spy for the Research and Analysis Wing (R&AW or RAW) for an undercover operation in Pakistan, where he faces both physical and emotional challenges. The film was inspired by the life of Indian spy Ravindra Kaushik and theatrically released on 5 April 2019.

Plot
In November 1971, at ISI detention cell, Karachi, a man is being given the 3rd degree of torture. The movie then goes 9 months back.

In 1971, Shrikant Rai, the Chief of the RAW recruits Rehamatullah Ali a.k.a. Romeo, a banker, after he manages to foil a bank robbery staged by the RAW agents to test his skills for espionage in Pakistan. After training in combat and covert communication techniques, he departs to Pakistan.

In Pakistan, he becomes Akbar Malik, and in his operations is helped by Joker and Mudassar, Pakistani locals helping RAW. Planned circumstances bring him closer to the target Isaq Afridi (Anil George), whose trust in him strengthens when Akbar not only assures him of his hatred towards India but also saves him from an attack conducted by the henchmen of Nawab Afridi. Akbar informs RAW about a planned attack on Badlipur that would claim innocent lives, both in India and East Pakistan. However, relations between Afridi and Akbar also intensify, due to which he refuses to betray him when Nawab approaches him with an offer to work for him. However, while leaving the rendezvous, Nawab forgets an envelope and asks Akbar to deliver it to the described room number. He is surprised to find his girlfriend Shraddha Sharma there and exclaims "You?" in disbelief. She gestures him to keep quiet and opens up a telephone receiver to show a spy transmitter inside it, proving that her room was bugged. She reveals that she, too was working for the RAW and was sent there because Akbar wanted someone close to be sent for him.

In the meanwhile, Colonel Khan's suspicion grows on Akbar, whom he arrests, interrogates, and tortures when he isn't able to extract any information. He is forced to free due to Akbar being Afridi's right hand. However, Akbar's cover soon gets blown, resulting in a chase between him and the colonel. Akbar manages to escape and arrives at home to find Mudassar telling him to escape. Akbar explains that there's no way to escape, due to which Mudassar agrees and goes to prepare tea for him. While waiting, Akbar suspects someone's presence. Hearing a gun clock, he takes out the gun given to him by Mudassar for emergencies, and shoots the person, only to realise it was no one else but Mudassar. Weeping but also remembering the latter's words warning him not to get entangled in relations, he escapes from the scene and the next day, disguised as an army captain, contacts Shrikant for help. The latter declines, telling him that he's not acting like an Indian any more. In the meanwhile, Shraddha and some other RAW agents are arrested while Joker commits suicide. Akbar then meets the army officer who interrogated him and his senior, revealing the truth. He decides to conduct the attacks on Badlipur himself as a form of revenge on the RAW. Accompanied by colonel Khan to avoid any sort of double-crossing, Akbar shocks him by bombing the entire village in a series of explosions, thus confirming his loyalty to Pakistan.

As a result, the Indo-Pakistani War breaks out. Akbar, now a Pakistani officer called Walter Khan, meets Shrikant and Awasthi in Nepal after 10 years. He departs after exchanging a few words and congratulating Awasthi for his impending promotion, leaving the latter surprised. Shrikant then reveals that Walter's still working undercover for India and how the latter's siding with Pakistan was all part of the plan. The bombing didn't cause any deaths as the villagers,  as under the pretext of warning about bad weather conditions, they were moved out 24 hours before it took place. Shrikant also reveals Walter's loyalty towards work was the only reason he couldn't turn up even at his mother's funeral. The film ends with a shot of Walter saluting the Indian flag with tears in his eyes.

Cast

Production
Initially, Sushant Singh Rajput was to star in the film as the protagonist but then they selected john abrahim instead of him.

Release 
The film was shot on location in Jammu and Kashmir, Gujarat and Nepal; it was initially scheduled to release on 15 March 2019 but then it was pushed back. It was scheduled to release worldwide on 12 April 2019 but later released on 5 April 2019. Eros International was being  distributed in Overseas.

Home media
The film became available as VOD on Netflix on 30 June 2019.

Reception

Critical response
Renuka Vyavahare of Times Of India finds the climax of the film audacious and gives one and half stars out of five. She concludes, "RAW has its moments but is rough around the edges. The climax is audacious and you need to suspend your belief, if you plan to watch it." "Overall, Romeo Akbar Walter is another interesting film from John Abraham. The movie has enough twists and turns to keep you intrigued and engaged. Go for it." says Gaurang Chauhan of Times Now and gives three stars out of five. Sanyukta Thakare writing for The Free Press Journal rates the film with one and a half stars out of five and says, "You would expect RAW to be an action-packed film as much as the trailer suggested, but the film is more of a drama web series that documents events one after the other, throwing in unnecessary emotional, romantic and climax more than it is required." Devesh Sharma of Filmfare giving 3 stars out of 5 says, "Watching the film is like akin to reading a John le Carré novel. You have one set of mandarins squaring off against the other with pawns being sacrificed for future advantage." Taran Adarsh gives 1.5 stars out of 5 says "Dull. Interesting stories don't necessarily translate into interesting films. Half baked writing + slow pacing play spoilsport. John, Jackie Shroff and Sikandar Kher excel. This thriller lacks thrill and grip."

Box office
Romeo Akbar Walter collected  on its opening day pan India. Its domestic gross was 45.84 crore and overseas gross 7.64 crore. It grossed 53.48 crore worldwide.

Soundtrack

The music of the film is composed by Ankit Tiwari, Sohail Sen, Shabbir Ahmed and Raaj Aashoo while the lyrics are penned by Shabbir Ahmed, Murli Agarwal, Prince Dubey and Ashok Punjabi.
Song "Jee Len De" Atif Aslam Version is Released in 26 May 2021 On YouTube Times Music Official Channel

References

External links
 
 
 
 

2010s Hindi-language films
2010s spy thriller films
2019 action thriller films
Films scored by Hitesh Sonik
Films scored by Amar Mohile
Films scored by Rochak Kohli
Films scored by Clinton Cerejo
2019 films
Indian spy thriller films
Indian action thriller films
Films shot in Jammu and Kashmir
Films set in Jammu and Kashmir
Films about the Research and Analysis Wing
Films set in the 1970s
India–Pakistan relations in popular culture
Films shot in Gujarat
Films shot in Nepal
Films set in Nepal
Films set in Karachi
Films set in Sindh
Films set in Pakistan
Films set in Gujarat
Films set in East Pakistan
Films based on Indo-Pakistani wars and conflicts
Films based on the Bangladesh Liberation War
Indian Army in films
Military of Pakistan in films